Wrocław Muchobór is a railway station in Wrocław, at Traktowa Street in the Muchobór Mały housing estate located at the crossroads of the Wrocław-Szczecin and Wrocław-Guben lines. Only passenger trains towards Zielona Góra and Legnica stop at the station. It is an important railway junction where the freight ring road begins (from the north-western side).

Over the course of several decades, three stations were named Muchobor or Mochbern, station in Muchobor Wielki is now Wrocław Zachodni, and Gądów is now Wrocław Gądów. Within the station, there is the Local Control Centre launched in 2011. The station is popular due to the fact that it is located in an office district, also called Mordor.

In 2018, 700-999 passengers were passing through the station daily.

Gallery

References

External links 
 
 Transport in Wroclaw

Railway stations in Poland opened in 1874
Muc
Railway stations served by Przewozy Regionalne InterRegio
Transport infrastructure completed in 1874